Wuling District  is one of two urban districts in Changde City, Hunan Province, China. Located on the central area of Changde, the district is surrounded by Dingcheng District to the north and south, bordered to the west by Taoyuan County, to the east by Hanshou County. It is divided into 11 subdistricts, one towns and two township, its government seat is Nanpinggang Subdistrict.

Administrative divisions
According to the result on adjustment of township-level administrative divisions of Wuling District on August 18, 2014, Wuling District has 11 subdistricts, one town and two townships under its jurisdiction. they are:

11 Subdistricts
 Baimahu, Changde
 Changgeng, Changde
 Chuanzihe
 Danyang, Changde
 Dongjiang, Changde
 Fuping, Changde
 Furong, Changde
 Nanpinggang
 Qiming
 Yong'an, Changde
 Zhilan

1 Town
 Hefu, Changde

2 Townships
 Danzhou, Changde
 Ludishan

References

 
County-level divisions of Hunan
Changde